John Wandesford (1593–1665) of Kirklington, Yorkshire was an English politician who sat in the House of Commons at various times between 1624 and 1665. 

Wandesford was the 2nd son of Sir Georges Wandesford of Kirklington and his wife Catherine Hansby of Beverley. He was the brother of Christopher Wandesford. He was educated at Cambridge University and admitted to study law at Gray's Inn on 28 February 1613.

In April 1624, Wandesford was elected Member of Parliament for Richmond, after which he was appointed consul in Aleppo. He was later elected to represent Hythe in the Short Parliament of 1640. A Royalist, he spent the Interregnum in exile in Paris, but after the Restoration of the Monarchy was finally elected again for Richmond, sitting in the Cavalier Parliament from 1662 until his death.

He died unmarried and was buried at St Andrews, Holborn on 21 Jan. 1665

References

|-

1593 births
1665 deaths
People from Hythe, Kent
Alumni of the University of Cambridge
Members of Gray's Inn
English MPs 1624–1625
English MPs 1640 (April)
English MPs 1661–1679
Cavaliers